In mathematics, an integer-valued polynomial (also known as a numerical polynomial)  is a polynomial whose value  is an integer for every integer n. Every polynomial with integer coefficients is integer-valued, but the converse is not true. For example, the polynomial

takes on integer values whenever t is an integer.  That is because one of t and  must be an even number. (The values this polynomial takes are the triangular numbers.)

Integer-valued polynomials are objects of study in their own right in algebra, and frequently appear in algebraic topology.

Classification
Inside the polynomial ring  of polynomials with rational number coefficients, the subring of integer-valued polynomials is a free abelian group. It has as basis the polynomials

In other words, every integer-valued polynomial can be written as an integer linear combination of binomial coefficients in exactly one way. The proof is by the method of discrete Taylor series: binomial coefficients are integer-valued polynomials, and conversely, the discrete difference of an integer series is an integer series, so the discrete Taylor series of an integer series generated by a polynomial has integer coefficients (and is a finite series).

Fixed prime divisors
Integer-valued polynomials may be used effectively to solve questions about fixed divisors of polynomials. For example, the polynomials P with integer coefficients that always take on even number values are just those such that  is integer valued. Those in turn are the polynomials that may be expressed as a linear combination with even integer coefficients of the binomial coefficients.

In questions of prime number theory, such as Schinzel's hypothesis H and the Bateman–Horn conjecture, it is a matter of basic importance to understand the case when P has no fixed prime divisor (this has been called Bunyakovsky's property, after Viktor Bunyakovsky). By writing P in terms of the binomial coefficients, we see the highest fixed prime divisor is also the highest prime common factor of the coefficients in such a representation. So Bunyakovsky's property is equivalent to coprime coefficients.

As an example, the pair of polynomials  and  violates this condition at : for every  the product

is divisible by 3, which follows from the representation

with respect to the binomial basis, where the highest common factor of the coefficients—hence the highest fixed divisor of —is 3.

Other rings
Numerical polynomials can be defined over other rings and fields, in which case the integer-valued polynomials above are referred to as classical numerical polynomials.

Applications
The K-theory of BU(n) is numerical (symmetric) polynomials.

The Hilbert polynomial of a polynomial ring in k + 1 variables is the numerical polynomial .

References

Algebra

Algebraic topology

Further reading
 

Polynomials
Number theory
Commutative algebra
Ring theory